Homalium ogoouense is a species of plant in the family Salicaceae. It is endemic to Gabon.

References

Flora of Gabon
ogoouense
Vulnerable plants
Endemic flora of Gabon
Taxonomy articles created by Polbot
Taxa named by François Pellegrin